Thomas J. Barton is an American chemist who served as the President of the American Chemical Society in 2014.

Biography
He graduated from Lamar University, and from University of Florida in 1967.
He was a post-doctoral fellow with National Institutes of Health  at the Ohio State University.

He is a professor at Iowa State University.

References

Year of birth missing (living people)
Living people
21st-century American chemists
Lamar University alumni
University of Florida alumni
Iowa State University faculty